In Greek mythology, Hippolochus ( Hippolokhos) may refer to two distinct characters:

 Hippolochus, a Lycian prince as son of Bellerophon and father of Glaucus, one of the Trojan Leaders.
 Hippolochus, a Trojan soldier and son of Antimachus.

Notes

References 

 Apollodorus, The Library with an English Translation by Sir James George Frazer, F.B.A., F.R.S. in 2 Volumes, Cambridge, MA, Harvard University Press; London, William Heinemann Ltd. 1921. ISBN 0-674-99135-4. Online version at the Perseus Digital Library. Greek text available from the same website.
 Homer, The Iliad with an English Translation by A.T. Murray, Ph.D. in two volumes. Cambridge, MA., Harvard University Press; London, William Heinemann, Ltd. 1924. . Online version at the Perseus Digital Library.
 Homer, Homeri Opera in five volumes. Oxford, Oxford University Press. 1920. . Greek text available at the Perseus Digital Library.

Characters in Greek mythology